Huang Shun-hsing (12 March 1923 – 5 March 2002) was a Taiwan-born politician. When he was born, Taiwan was ruled by Japan. Huang held political office in the Republic of China on Taiwan, and later in the People's Republic of China.

Huang was raised in present-day Changhua County. He attended an agricultural school in Japan, then worked in Shanghai for two years before returning to Taiwan, settling in Taitung. Huang served on the Taitung County Council for three terms, and as Taitung County Magistrate for one term prior to contesting his first legislative election in 1972. Huang was reelected to the Legislative Yuan in 1975. He was active in the tangwai movement, and contributed to Formosa Magazine. Huang favored unification with China. After he lost the Changhua County magistracy to George Huang in 1981, Huang Shun-hsing was imprisoned for a time because his daughter had left for China. Huang himself moved to Beijing in 1985. He was elected to the 7th National People's Congress in 1988, as an independent. Huang became known for voting against the confirmation of Zhou Gucheng, who won reelection as chair of the Education, Science, Culture and Public Health Committee. This was the first act of opposition at a meeting of the NPC since the body first met in 1954. Huang resigned from the NPC in 1992, over a disagreement regarding the Three Gorges Dam project, and died in 2002 of a heart attack.

References

1923 births
2002 deaths
Changhua County Members of the Legislative Yuan
Nantou County Members of the Legislative Yuan
Taichung Members of the Legislative Yuan
People's Republic of China politicians from Beijing
Taiwanese emigrants to China
Magistrates of Taitung County
Delegates to the 7th National People's Congress
Taiwanese prisoners and detainees
Prisoners and detainees of Taiwan
Taiwanese defectors
Burials at Babaoshan Revolutionary Cemetery